The 1950 Texas gubernatorial election was held on November 7, 1950.

Incumbent Democratic Governor Allan Shivers defeated Republican nominee Ralph W. Currie with 89.93% of the vote.

Primary elections
Primary elections were held on July 22, 1950.

Democratic primary

Candidates
Wellington Abbey
Charles B. Hutchison, unsuccessful candidate for Democratic nomination for Governor in 1946 and 1948
Benita Lawrence, teacher
Caso March, former Baylor University law professor and unsuccessful candidate for Democratic nomination for Governor in 1946 and 1948
Gene S. Porter, unsuccessful candidate for Democratic nomination for Governor in 1942 and 1944
Allan Shivers, incumbent Governor
J. M. Wren

Results

General election

Candidates
Allan Shivers, Democratic
Ralph W. Currie, Republican

Results

References

Bibliography
 
 

1950
Texas
Gubernatorial
November 1950 events in the United States